The Baltimore Underground Science Space (BUGSS) is a non-profit synthetic biology and biotechnology makerspace laboratory for science enthusiasts, hobbyists, and professionals to practice, share and learn about the biological sciences.  BUGSS is closely aligned with do-it-yourself biology and the Maryland science community generally, and offers courses and lectures in addition to community lab space.  It was founded by Dr. Tom Burkett in 2012.  It is located in the Highlandtown neighborhood of Baltimore, Maryland.

BUGSS has regularly hosted teams for the annual International Genetically Engineered Machine (iGEM) competition.  In 2014, the team focused on 3D bioprinting.  In 2016, the team worked on isolating the genes in the bacterium Ideonella sakaiensis that allow it to consume the plastic PET, and introducing them into Escherichia coli.

BUGSS has 20-25 members in 2017.

References

External links
 Official website
 The Rise of Do-It-Yourself Biology: A Look at the Baltimore Underground Science Space (BUGSS) - a documentary film about the organization

Biotechnology organizations
2012 establishments in Maryland
Public laboratories
Non-profit organizations based in Maryland